Megachile wagenknechti is a species of bee in the family Megachilidae. It was described by Ruiz in 1936.

References

Wagenknechti
Insects described in 1936